Ben O'Keeffe (born 3 January 1989) is a rugby union referee from New Zealand. He currently referees at domestic, Super Rugby and test match level.

Domestic career
O'Keeffe became a professional referee for the New Zealand Rugby Union (NZRU) in 2013 having started officiating in 2008 at the age of 19. On 31 August 2013, he made his domestic debut during the 2013 ITM Cup match between Auckland and Bay of Plenty. On 24 October 2015, he officiated the 2015 ITM Cup Final between Canterbury and Auckland.

In 2014, he started to appear at Super Rugby level as an assistant referee, before going on to be selected by World Rugby for the 2014 IRB Junior World Championship. He made four appearances as the main official, one of which was the final between England and South Africa.

He continued to referee at domestic level that year, before being selected for the 2015 Super Rugby season on 27 January 2015. He made his debut during the second round of the tournament, taking charge of the Highlanders vs Crusaders clash on 21 February as a late call up for injured referee Chris Pollock. He was the man in the middle for the Sunwolves Super Rugby debut on 27 February 2016. He was also one of the referees to officiate the 2016 Super Rugby Final between the Hurricanes and Lions which the Hurricanes won 20 - 3.

O'Keefe, now a regular on the Super Rugby circuit, was appointed to referee the final of Super Rugby Aotearoa 2021 and inaugural Super Rugby Pacific in 2022 which he was credited for his handling of two controversial moments. 

He was recipient of New Zealand Referee of the year awards in 2018 and 2021.

International career
On 18 July 2015 he made his international debut as an assistant referee, officiating in the first match of the 2015 World Rugby Pacific Nations Cup, Fiji vs Tonga.

In 2016, O'Keeffe made his Six Nations Championship debut on 7 February as assistant referee in the Ireland vs Wales match, then Italy vs England the following weekend.

On 11 June 2016, O'Keeffe made his international refereeing debut, taking charge of the historic match between Samoa and Georgia which ended in a 19 all draw. The following week he officiated his first Tier 1 nation, refereeing Scotland's first test against Japan on 18 June. He was appointed to his first Rugby Championship match in August 2016, as assistant referee when South Africa hosted Argentina.

On 19 November 2016, he refereed his first Tier 1 v Tier 1 match, taking charge of Scotland's narrow win over Argentina in Edinburgh and now regularly referees both Six Nations and Rugby Championship tournaments.

He was selected as the youngest referee at the 2019 Rugby World Cup in Japan and went on to referee three pool play games as well as assistant referee in the knock out stages. He was widely praised for his handling in the final pool match of the tournament; the historic 28-21 win by host nations Japan over Scotland. He then went on to be a match official in all play-off games including the final, England vs South Africa.

O'Keefe began his 2020 International refereeing campaign in the 2020 Six Nations Championship, officiating both Italy vs Scotland and England vs Wales.

O'Keefe is now recognised as one of the top match officials globally and was selected to referee the 2nd test of the British and Irish Lions tour of South Africa in 2021.

Personal life
O'Keeffe grew up in Blenheim, New Zealand and attended Marlborough Boys' College where he was head boy in 2006. He then studied a Bachelor of Medicine and Bachelor of Surgery (MB ChB) at the University of Otago, graduating in 2012.

He practises as a medical doctor in ophthalmology and is the co-founder of the social enterprise oDocs Eye Care, which aims at creating medical technology to prevent blindness.

O'Keeffe's brother, Michael O'Keeffe, represented New Zealand at the 2012 London Olympics in football.

References

1989 births
Living people
New Zealand rugby union referees
Super Rugby referees
The Rugby Championship referees
Rugby World Cup referees
People from Blenheim, New Zealand
People educated at Marlborough Boys' College